The Committee for Independence and Democracy in Laos is a political group, believed to consist of ex-army officers, some ethnic Hmong people, and others disaffected with the communist regime in Laos. They claimed responsibility for several attacks on the government in 2004.

Paramilitary organizations based in Laos